One third of Havant Borough Council in Hampshire, England is elected each year, followed by one year without election. Since the last boundary changes in 2002, 38 councillors have been elected from 14 wards.

Political control
Since the first election to the council in 1973 political control of the council has been held by the following parties:

Leadership
The leaders of the council since 2001 have been:

Council elections
Summary of the council composition after recent council elections, click on the year for full details of each election. Boundary changes took place for the 2002 election reducing the number of seats by 4, leading to the whole council being elected in that year.

1973 Havant Borough Council election
1976 Havant Borough Council election (New ward boundaries)
1979 Havant Borough Council election
1980 Havant Borough Council election
1982 Havant Borough Council election
1983 Havant Borough Council election
1984 Havant Borough Council election (Borough boundary changes took place but the number of seats remained the same)
1986 Havant Borough Council election
1987 Havant Borough Council election
1988 Havant Borough Council election
1990 Havant Borough Council election

Borough result maps

By-election results
By-elections occur when seats become vacant between council elections. Below is a summary of recent by-elections; full by-election results can be found by clicking on the by-election name.

References

External links
Havant Borough Council